Bryotype is a genus of moths of the family Noctuidae.

Species
 Bryotype flavipicta (Hampson, 1894)
 Bryotype harmodina Draudt, 1950
 Bryotype mesomelana (Hampson, 1902)

References
 Bryotype  at Markku Savela's Lepidoptera and Some Other Life Forms
 Natural History Museum Lepidoptera genus database

Cuculliinae